The Mocking of Christ may refer to:

 Mocking of Jesus as portrayed in the Bible
 The Mocking of Christ (van Dyck)
 The Mocking of Christ (Grünewald)
 Christ Crowned with Thorns (Annibale Carracci, Bologna), or Mocking of Christ
 Christ Mocked by Cimabue